Cladomyrma is a genus of ants in the subfamily Formicinae. The genus is restricted to the Malay Peninsula, Borneo and Sumatra. All known Cladomyrma species build their nests on live stems.

Species
 Cladomyrma andrei (Emery, 1894)
 Cladomyrma aurochaetae Agosti, Moog & Maschwitz, 1999
 Cladomyrma crypteroniae Agosti, Moog & Maschwitz, 1999
 Cladomyrma dianeae Agosti, Moog & Maschwitz, 1999
 Cladomyrma hewitti (Wheeler, 1910)
 Cladomyrma hobbyi Donisthorpe, 1937
 Cladomyrma maryatiae Agosti, Moog & Maschwitz, 1999
 Cladomyrma maschwitzi Agosti, 1991
 Cladomyrma nudidorsalis Agosti, Moog & Maschwitz, 1999
 Cladomyrma petalae Agosti, 1991
 Cladomyrma scopulosa Eguchi & Bui, 2006
 Cladomyrma sirindhornae Jaitrong, Laedprathom & Yamane, 2013
 Cladomyrma yongi Agosti, Moog & Maschwitz, 1999

References

External links

Formicinae
Ant genera
Hymenoptera of Asia